Homer Truett Bone (January 25, 1883 – March 11, 1970) was an American attorney and politician in Washington state, where he settled in Tacoma as a youth with his family from Indiana. He ran as a candidate for a variety of parties and was elected to the State House. In 1932, he was elected as a Democrat as United States Senator from Washington, and re-elected to a second term. 

In 1944 Bone was appointed as a United States circuit judge of the United States Court of Appeals for the Ninth Circuit. He served until his death, the last years in senior status.

Education and career

Born on January 25, 1883, in Franklin, Johnson County, Indiana, Bone attended the public schools. He first worked for the United States postal service and in the accounting and credit department of a furniture company. 

Bone moved with his parents and family to Tacoma, Washington in 1899 after the state was admitted to the Union. He graduated from the Tacoma Law School (now defunct) in 1911. He was admitted to the bar the same year and entered private practice in Tacoma. From 1911 to 1932, he was in private practice. 

In 1912 Bone served as a special deputy prosecutor for Pierce County, Washington in 1912. He also served as corporation counsel for the Port of Tacoma in Washington from 1918 to 1932. 

Initially belonging to the Socialist Party of America, Bone ran as an unsuccessful candidate for prosecuting attorney and Mayor of Tacoma. He was elected to the Washington House of Representatives as a Farmer-Labor candidate, serving one term from 1923 to 1924.

State advocacy

While in the Washington House of Representatives, Bone advocated for county governments to have the ability to form public utility districts, a political battle that was finally won when voters approved it as an initiative he helped spearhead.

Congressional service

Bone ran unsuccessfully for the Farmer–Labor Party as a candidate for the United States House of Representatives. In 1928 he was an unsuccessful candidate for the Republican nomination in to a seat in the United States House of Representatives of the 71st United States Congress. 

With the deepening of the Great Depression and changing political attitudes among voters, Bone joined the Democratic Party. He ran for the United States Senate in 1932 and defeated multi-term incumbent, Republican Wesley L. Jones. Bone was reelected in 1938, serving in total from March 4, 1933, until his resignation on November 13, 1944, when he was confirmed for a federal judgeship. He served as Chairman of the Committee on Patents for the 76th through the 78th United States Congresses.

Congressional advocacy

Bone continued his advocacy for publicly owned power and other progressive causes. He supported construction of the Bonneville Dam and the Grand Coulee Dam in western Washington state, which were important for hydropower generation, flood control, and irrigation. 

He opposed involvement in World War II. Along with Senator Matthew Neely and Representative Warren Magnuson, Bone wrote the legislation that created the National Cancer Institute, one of the elements of the National Institutes of Health.

Federal judicial service

Bone was nominated by President Franklin D. Roosevelt on April 1, 1944, to a seat on the United States Court of Appeals for the Ninth Circuit, which had been vacated by Judge Bert E. Haney. He was confirmed by the United States Senate on April 1, 1944, and received his commission the same day. He assumed senior status on January 1, 1956. 

His service terminated on March 11, 1970, due to his death in Tacoma. He had returned to Tacoma in 1968, after living in San Francisco, California since his appointment to the federal bench. He was cremated and his ashes interred in Oakwood Cemetery.

Other service

While in senior status, Bone engaged in private practice in San Francisco from 1956 to 1968.

References

External links
 Homer T. Bone papers

1883 births
1970 deaths
Judges of the United States Court of Appeals for the Ninth Circuit
United States court of appeals judges appointed by Franklin D. Roosevelt
20th-century American judges
Democratic Party United States senators from Washington (state)
Washington (state) Democrats
Washington (state) Republicans
Washington (state) Farmer–Laborites
Socialist Party of America politicians from Washington (state)
People from Franklin, Indiana
Politicians from Tacoma, Washington